Swift Glacier is a steep glacier about 2 nautical miles (3.7 km) long, close west of Jefford Point, James Ross Island. Named by United Kingdom Antarctic Place-Names Committee (UK-APC) following Falkland Islands Dependencies Survey (FIDS) surveys, 1958–61. The name is descriptive, this being one of the most active glaciers on the island.

See also
 List of glaciers in the Antarctic
 Glaciology

References
 
 

Glaciers of James Ross Island